Heinrich Funck (–1760) was a mill operator, religious author and a Mennonite bishop in America.

Biography
Heinrich Funck is commonly believed to have been born in the Palatinate region of Germany. No baptismal record is known. He was a descendant of Swiss Mennonites who were expelled from Bern, Switzerland, in the 17th century based largely on their religious beliefs. Funck arrived in Philadelphia in 1717 with his family and other German Palatines, seeking a place to freely practice their Mennonite faith, including Dielman Kolb (1691–1756), who became an early Mennonite minister in Pennsylvania.

During 1719, he settled in Franconia Township, Montgomery County, Pennsylvania. In about 1720, Funck married Anne Meyer (ca 1700–1758), daughter of Mennonite immigrant Christian Meyer (1676–1751). They would be the parents of ten children. Heinrich Funck was the grandfather of Joseph Funk and of Jacob Funk, the original owner of the historic Jacob Funk House and Barn.

In 1725, Heinrich Funck built and operated a grist mill on Indian Creek in Franconia Township in what is today Telford, Pennsylvania. In 1738, Heinrich Funck, together with others including Dielman Kolb and Christian Meyer, was instrumental in purchasing land for the Salford Mennonite meeting house. The Salford Mennonite Congregation itself had dated to 1717. He served for many years as bishop in the Franconia Mennonite Conference.

From 1745 to 1748, together with Dielman Kolb, he supervised the translation of the classic 1660 Dutch religious history Martyrs Mirror into the German language. Funck also wrote two German-language religious books: Ein Spiegel der Taufe (A Mirror of Baptism), published in 1744, and Eine Restitution, Oder eine Erklaerung einiger Haupt-puncten des Gesetzes (Restitution, or an Explanation of Several Principal Points of the Law), published posthumously by his children in 1763.

Heinrich Funck died during 1760 and was buried in the Delp Burying Ground in Harleysville, Pennsylvania. A memorial gravestone there lists him as Henry Funk.

See also
Funkite

References

Other sources
Boldt, Andrea; Werner Enninger, Delbert L. Gratz  (1997) Mennonites in Transition From Switzerland to America (Masthof Press) 
Kasdorf, Julia Spicher  (2009) The Body and the Book: Writing from a Mennonite Life: Essays and Poems (Penn State Press)  
Ruth, John L. (1984) Maintaining the Right Fellowship: a narrative account of life in the oldest Mennonite community in North America (Franconia Mennonite Conference)

Related Reading
Wenger, John Christian   (1937) History of the Mennonites of the Franconia Conference  (Franconia Mennonite Historical Society)

External links
Martyrs Mirror of the Defenseless Christians
   Mennonite Church History (1906)  Hartzler, Jonas Smucker; Kauffman, Daniel (Mennonite Book and Tract Company. Scottdale, PA) 
Salford Mennonite Church website

1690s births
1760 deaths
Year of birth uncertain
American Mennonites
Mennonite ministers
American Christian religious leaders
American people of Swiss-German descent
German emigrants to the Thirteen Colonies
German Mennonites
German Palatines
Pennsylvania Dutch people
Protestantism in Pennsylvania
18th-century American people
Religious leaders from Pennsylvania
18th-century Anabaptist ministers
Mennonite writers